Baruq is a city in West Azerbaijan Province, Iran.

Baruq may also refer to:
 Baruq, Ardabil
 Baruq, East Azerbaijan
 Baruq, South Khorasan
 Baruq District, in West Azerbaijan Province
 Baruq Rural District (disambiguation)